Lake Cochichewick is a lake in North Andover, Massachusetts that collects water from Weir Hill and other local uplands.  Its overflow drains into the Cochichewick River, which joins the Merrimack. 
Brooks School, a private co-educational prep school, is located on the shores of the lake.

Etymology
The name for Lake Cochichewick reportedly comes from the Pennacook word for "dashing stream" or "place of the great cascade" and during the early years of Andover it was called "The Great Pond".

Public access restrictions
For the past century, Lake Cochichewick has been North Andover's main supply of drinking water and public access to the lake was forbidden.  In May 2002, however, the town began issuing boating permits:
Certain watercraft are allowed and must be designed to be manually propelled, by oars or paddles. Rowing shells, johnboats, dinghies, rowboats, canoes and kayaks are acceptable as long as the occupants are isolated from contact with the lake. Boats must not have any thru-holes (e.g. self-bailers) that would allow contact between the occupants and the lake water. Electric motors are acceptable as an alternate form of propulsion. The maximum length of a motorized craft is 15 feet. Inflatable boats, windsurfers and seaplanes are not allowed. No domestic animals are allowed to be in boats, on the ice, or in the water at any time.

Swimming is not allowed on Lake Cochichewick, neither for humans nor dogs. The town has posted signs along the trails near the lake informing hikers that it is used for drinking water, and that swimming is punishable with a $50 fine.

Public health issues
As the Merrimack Valley was once highly industrialized, there has been concern about the levels of contaminants such as mercury in Lake Cochichewick and other local waters.  However, recent tests have shown a significant drop in mercury levels in fish such as yellow perch and largemouth bass.  A spokesperson for the state Department of Environmental Protection said:[O]bviously the move to severely restrict mercury emissions from trash incinerators as well as closing down all state medical waste incinerators really has had a positive impact. ... It takes a long time for mercury to build up in the environment, and our thought is that it will take quite a bit of time to leave the environment. ... This is showing us that in a relatively short period of time we can have some dramatic reductions.

References

External links
 Map of Lake Cochichewick Trails

North Andover, Massachusetts
Cochichewick
Cochichewick